Ahmed Shafik (May 1933 – October 31, 2007) was an Egyptian researcher whose studies centered on human anatomy, physiology, surgery and sexual physiology and other associated reflexes.

Work
He has written more than 1000 articles. He performed the first bladder transplant in 1967. His articles in the Journal of Urology, are published under the name 'Shafik I.' and his articles in the British Journal of Urology and in medical literature are published under 'Shafik II'.

In 2016, Dr Shafik won an Ig Nobel prize for his study of the effects of wearing polyester, cotton, or wool trousers on the sex life of rats.

Criticism
His research brought official criticism from the Egyptian Government.

In 1963, he was arrested and held for three months, while developing a new technique for urinary diversion. It was later published in the Journal of Urology. In 1964, he was arrested and held for a year while working on fashioning an artificial bladder. His performing the first bladder transplant in 1967 resulted in disciplinary measures with the administration of his hospital.

Death
On October 31, 2007, Ahmed Shafik died from cardiac insufficiency.

References

External links 
 

2007 deaths
1933 births
Cairo University alumni
Egyptian sexologists
Egyptian urologists
Qasr El Eyni Hospital
20th-century surgeons